Bukit Merah is a subzone within the planning area of Bukit Merah, Singapore, as defined by the Urban Redevelopment Authority (URA). Its boundary is made up of Jalan Bukit Merah in the north; Lower Delta Road in the east; the Ayer Rajah Expressway (AYE) in the south; and the industrial estate at the end of Jalan Kilang Timor in the west.

References

Bukit Merah
Central Region, Singapore